is a serial UNESCO World Heritage Site consisting of five component parts on four Japanese islands in the Ryukyu Chain of the Nansei Islands. The site was selected in terms of biodiversity (World Heritage criterion x) for having a diverse ecosystem of plant and animal species that are unique to the region.

History
First selected as a candidate site in 2003, the original nomination was added to the Tentative List in 2016; after initial IUCN evaluation, in 2018 the nomination was withdrawn for revision, prior to resubmission the following year; after further evaluation, in 2021 IUCN recommended inscription in July of the revised nomination. UNESCO voted to list it as a World Heritage Site in 2021.

Naming dispute

In the long history of the campaign for registration, this candidate site was renamed at least twice. When a panel of natural scientists formally added it to Japan's tentative list of nomination, it was given the name of Ryūkyū Shotō. This followed a convention of natural sciences but is inconsistent with the official definition provided by the Japanese government, which excludes the Amami Islands from the Ryūkyū Shotō. Moreover, the Amami Islands and Kagoshima Prefecture as a whole voiced a strong opposition to having the label Ryūkyū imposed on themselves. As a result, the candidate site was renamed to Amami–Ryukyu. In late 2015, UNESCO's committee recommended Japan "from a technical perspective" to use an accurate designation of the areas under nomination. In response, the candidate site was renamed again to the current, highly descriptive name in 2016.

Components
The serial World Heritage Site comprises five component parts on four islands:

Biodiversity
Of the above, 189 species of vascular plant are endemic (c.10% of the total number of species found), as are 13 terrestrial mammals (62%), 5 birds, 18 amphibians (86%), 23 reptiles (64%), and 14 inland fish. Of the 6,153 insect species found, 1,607 are endemic.

Endemic taxa
Endemic taxa include the following, with EDGE species marked with an asterisk (though an EDGE species, Iriomote's Kampira Falls frog is not listed below, since it is found also in Taiwan):

In addition to the above, Okinawan avian subspecies found in Yanbaru (the northern part of Okinawa) include those of the Ashy minivet, Brown-eared bulbul, brown boobook, Collared scops owl, Japanese bush warbler, Japanese paradise flycatcher, Japanese pygmy woodpecker, Japanese tit, Japanese white-eye, Large-billed crow, Narcissus flycatcher, Oriental turtle dove, Ruddy-breasted crake, Ruddy kingfisher, and Varied tit; similarly, but found in the Yaeyama Islands (which include Iriomote), are endemic subspecies of the Brown-eared bulbul, Emerald dove, Japanese pygmy woodpecker, Japanese tit, and Japanese wood pigeon.

Protection
Areas of the Site and species living within are protected by a raft of complementary measures, including designation as National Parks (Amami Guntō National Park, Yanbaru National Park, Iriomote-Ishigaki National Park), Forest Biosphere Reserves (Amami Guntō Forest Biosphere Reserve, Yanbaru Forest Biosphere Reserve, Iriomote Forest Biosphere Reserve), Wildlife Protection Areas (Yuwan-dake Wildlife Protection Area, Yanbaru (Ada) Wildlife Protection Area, Yanbaru (Aha) Wildlife Protection Area, Iriomote Wildlife Protection Area, plus twenty-four Prefectural Wildlife Protection Areas), and Natural Monuments (thirty National, and a further twenty-two Prefectural Monuments).

See also
 List of World Heritage Sites in Japan
 List of National Parks in Japan
 Protected Forests (Japan)
 Wildlife Protection Areas in Japan
 List of Natural Monuments of Japan (Okinawa)
 List of Natural Monuments of Japan (Kagoshima)
 Japanese Red List

References

External links
 Nomination of Amami-Oshima Island, Tokunoshima Island, the northern part of Okinawa Island, and Iriomote Island (Ministry of the Environment)
 Amami-Oshima Island, Tokunoshima Island, the northern part of Okinawa Island and Iriomote Island (UNESCO Tentative List entry)

Ryukyu Islands
Geography of Kagoshima Prefecture
Geography of Okinawa Prefecture
World Heritage Sites in Japan